Sofia Costanza Brigida Villani Scicolone (born 20 September 1934), known professionally as Sophia Loren, is an Italian actress. She was named by the American Film Institute as one of the greatest stars of Classical Hollywood cinema and as of 2023, is one of the last surviving major stars from the era. Loren is also the only remaining living person to appear on AFI's list of the 50 greatest  stars of American film history, positioned 21st.

Encouraged to enroll in acting lessons after entering a beauty pageant, Loren began her film career at age sixteen in 1950. She appeared in several bit parts and minor roles in the early part of the decade, until her five-picture contract with Paramount in 1956 launched her international career. Her film appearances around this time include The Pride and the Passion, Houseboat, and It Started in Naples. During the 1950s, she starred in films as a sexually emancipated persona and was one of the best known sex symbols of the time.

Loren's performance as Cesira in the film Two Women (1961) directed by Vittorio De Sica won her the Academy Award for Best Actress, making her the first actor to win an Oscar for a non-English-language performance. She holds the record for having earned seven David di Donatello Awards for Best Actress: Two Women; Yesterday, Today and Tomorrow (1963); Marriage Italian Style (1964, for which she was nominated for a second Oscar); Sunflower (1970); The Voyage (1974); A Special Day (1977) and The Life Ahead (2020). She has won five special Golden Globes (including the Cecil B. DeMille Award), a BAFTA Award, a Laurel Award, a Grammy Award, the Volpi Cup for Best Actress at the Venice Film Festival and the Best Actress Award at the Cannes Film Festival. In 1991, she received the Academy Honorary Award for lifetime achievements.

At the start of the 1980s, Loren chose to make rarer film appearances. Since then, she has appeared in films such as Prêt-à-porter (1994), Grumpier Old Men (1995), Nine (2009), and The Life Ahead (2020).

Early life

Family and childhood 
Sofia Costanza Brigida Villani Scicolone was born on September 20, 1934, in the Clinica Regina Margherita in Rome, Italy, the daughter of Romilda Villani (1910–1991) and Riccardo Scicolone Murillo (1907–1976). Her father, "having had no success as an engineer", worked temporarily for the national railway Ferrovie dello Stato Italiane. Loren claimed in her autobiography that her father was of noble descent, by virtue of which she is entitled to call herself "Viscountess of Pozzuoli, Lady of Caserta, a title given by the House of Hohenstaufen, Marchioness of Licata Scicolone Murillo".

Loren's father, Riccardo Scicolone, refused to marry Villani, leaving the piano teacher and aspiring actress without financial support. Loren met with her father three times, at age five, age seventeen and in 1976 at his deathbed, stating that she forgave him but had never forgotten his abandonment of her mother. Loren's parents had another child together, her sister Maria, in 1938. Scicolone did not want to formally recognise Maria as his daughter. When Loren became successful, she paid her father in order to have her sister Maria take the Scicolone last name. Loren has two younger paternal half-brothers, Giuliano and Giuseppe. Romilda, Sofia, and Maria lived with Loren's grandmother in Pozzuoli, near Naples.

During the Second World War, the harbour and munitions plant in Pozzuoli was a frequent bombing target of the Allies. During one raid, as Loren ran to the shelter, she was struck by shrapnel and wounded in the chin. After that, the family moved to Naples, where they were taken in by distant relatives. After the war, Loren and her family returned to Pozzuoli. Loren's grandmother Luisa opened a pub in their living room, selling homemade cherry liquor. Romilda Villani played the piano, Maria sang, and Loren waited on tables and washed dishes. The place was popular with the American GIs stationed nearby.

Pageantry 
At age 15, Loren as Sofia Lazzaro entered the Miss Italia 1950 beauty pageant and was assigned as Candidate No. 2, being one of the four contestants representing the Lazio region. She was selected as one of the last three finalists and won the title of Miss Elegance 1950, while Liliana Cardinale won the title of Miss Cinema and Anna Maria Bugliari won the grand title of Miss Italia. She returned in 2001 as president of the jury for the 61st edition of the pageant. In 2010, Loren crowned the 71st Miss Italia pageant winner.

Career

Early roles 

Sofia Lazzaro enrolled in the Centro Sperimentale di Cinematografia, the national film school of Italy and appeared as an uncredited extra in Mervyn LeRoy's 1951 film Quo Vadis, when she was 16 years old.

That same year, Loren appeared in the Italian film Era lui... sì! sì!, in which she played an odalisque, and was credited as Sofia Lazzaro. In the early part of the decade, she played bit parts and had minor roles in several films, including La Favorita (1952).

Carlo Ponti changed her name and public image to appeal to a wider audience as Sophia Loren, being a twist on the name of the Swedish actress Märta Torén and suggested by Goffredo Lombardo. Her first starring role was in Aida (1953), for which she received critical acclaim.

After playing the lead role in Two Nights with Cleopatra (1953), her breakthrough role was in The Gold of Naples (1954), directed by Vittorio De Sica. Too Bad She's Bad, also released in 1954, and La Bella Mugnaia (1955) became the first of many films in which Loren co-starred with Marcello Mastroianni. Over the next three years, she acted in many films, including Scandal in Sorrento, Lucky to Be a Woman, Boy on a Dolphin, Legend of the Lost and The Pride and the Passion (1957), the latter film a Napoleonic era war-epic set in Spain starring Cary Grant and Frank Sinatra.

International stardom 
Loren became an international film star following her five-picture contract with Paramount Pictures in 1958. Among her films at this time were Desire Under the Elms with Anthony Perkins, based upon the Eugene O'Neill play; Houseboat, a romantic comedy co-starring Cary Grant; and George Cukor's Heller in Pink Tights, in which she appeared as a blonde for the first time.In 1960, Loren starred in Vittorio De Sica's Two Women, a stark, gritty story of a mother who is trying to protect her 12-year-old daughter in war-torn Italy. The two end up gang-raped inside a church as they travel back to their home city following cessation of bombings there. Originally cast as the daughter, Loren fought against type and was eventually cast as the mother (actress Eleonora Brown would portray the daughter). Loren's performance earned her many awards, including the Cannes Film Festival's best performance prize, and an Academy Award for Best Actress, the first major Academy Award for a non-English-language performance or to an Italian actress. She won 22 international awards for Two Women. The film was extremely well received by critics and a huge commercial success. Though proud of this accomplishment, Loren did not show up to this award, citing fear of fainting at the award ceremony. Nevertheless, Cary Grant telephoned her in Rome the next day to inform her of the Oscar award.
During the 1960s, Loren was one of the most popular actresses in the world, and continued to make films in the United States and Europe, starring with prominent leading men. In 1961 and 1964, her career reached its pinnacle when she received $1 million to appear in El Cid and The Fall of the Roman Empire. In 1965, she received a second Academy Award nomination for her performance in Marriage Italian-Style opposite Marcello Mastroianni.

Among Loren's best-known films of this period are Samuel Bronston's epic production of El Cid (1961) with Charlton Heston, The Millionairess (1960) with Peter Sellers, It Started in Naples (1960) with Clark Gable, Vittorio De Sica's triptych Yesterday, Today and Tomorrow (1963) with Marcello Mastroianni, Peter Ustinov's Lady L (1965) with Paul Newman, the 1966 classic Arabesque with Gregory Peck, and Charlie Chaplin's final film, A Countess from Hong Kong (1967) with Marlon Brando.

Loren received four Golden Globe Awards between 1964 and 1977 as "World Film Favorite – Female".

Continued success 
Loren appeared in fewer movies after becoming a mother. During the next decade, most of her roles were in Italian features. During the 1970s, she was paired with Richard Burton in the last De Sica-directed film, The Voyage (1974), and a remake of the film Brief Encounter (1974). The film had its premiere on US television on 12 November 1974 as part of the Hallmark Hall of Fame series on NBC. In 1976, she starred in The Cassandra Crossing. It fared extremely well internationally, and was a respectable box office success in the US market. She co-starred with Marcello Mastroianni again in Ettore Scola's A Special Day (1977). This movie was nominated for 11 international awards such as two Oscars (best actor in leading role, best foreign picture). It won a Golden Globe Award and a César Award for best foreign movie. Loren's performance was awarded with a David di Donatello Award, the seventh in her career. The movie was extremely well received by American reviewers and became a box office hit.
Following this success, Loren starred in an American thriller Brass Target. This movie received mixed reviews, although it was moderately successful in the United States and internationally. In 1978, she won her fourth Golden Globe for "world film favorite". Other movies of this decade were Academy Award nominee Sunflower (1970), which was a critical success, and Arthur Hiller's Man of La Mancha (1972), which was a critical and commercial failure despite being nominated for several awards, including two Golden Globes. Peter O'Toole and James Coco were nominated for two NBR awards, in addition the NBR listed Man of La Mancha in its best ten pictures of 1972 list.In 1980, after the international success of the biography Sophia Loren: Living and Loving, Her Own Story by A. E. Hotchner, Loren portrayed herself and her mother in a made-for-television biopic adaptation of her autobiography, Sophia Loren: Her Own Story. Ritza Brown and Chiara Ferrari each portrayed the younger Loren. In 1981, she became the first female celebrity to launch her own perfume, 'Sophia', and a brand of eyewear soon followed.

In 1982, while in Italy, she made headlines after serving an 18-day prison sentence on tax evasion charges – a fact that failed to hamper her popularity or career. In 2013, the supreme court of Italy cleared her of the charges.

Loren acted infrequently during the 1980s and in 1981 turned down the role of Alexis Carrington in the television series Dynasty. Although she was set to star in 13 episodes of CBS's Falcon Crest in 1984 as Angela Channing's half-sister Francesca Gioberti, negotiations fell through at the last moment and the role went to Gina Lollobrigida instead. Loren preferred devoting more time to raising her sons.

Loren has recorded more than two dozen songs throughout her career, including a best-selling album of comedic songs with Peter Sellers; reportedly, she had to fend off his romantic advances. Partly owing to Sellers's infatuation with Loren, he split with his first wife, Anne Howe. Loren has made it clear to numerous biographers that Sellers's affections were reciprocated only platonically. This collaboration was covered in The Life and Death of Peter Sellers where actress Sonia Aquino portrayed Loren. The song "Where Do You Go To (My Lovely)?" by Peter Sarstedt was said to have been inspired by Loren.

Later career 
In 1991, Loren received the Academy Honorary Award stating that she has been "One of the genuine treasures of world cinema who, in a career rich with memorable performances, has added permanent luster to our art form." In 1995, she received the Golden Globe Cecil B. DeMille Award.

She presented Federico Fellini with his honorary Oscar in April 1993. In 2009, Loren stated on Larry King Live that Fellini had planned to direct her in a film shortly before his death in 1993. Throughout the 1990s and 2000s, Loren was selective about choosing her films and ventured into various areas of business, including cookbooks, eyewear, jewelry, and perfume. She received a Golden Globe nomination for her performance in Robert Altman's film Ready to Wear (1994), co-starring Julia Roberts.

In 1994, a Golden Palm Star on the Palm Springs, California, Walk of Stars was dedicated to her.

In Grumpier Old Men (1995), Loren played a femme fatale opposite Walter Matthau, Jack Lemmon, and Ann-Margret. The film was a box-office success and became Loren's biggest US hit in years. At the 20th Moscow International Film Festival in 1997, she was awarded an Honorable Prize for contribution to cinema. In 1999, the American Film Institute named Loren among the greatest female stars of Golden Age of Hollywood cinema. In 2001, Loren received a Special Grand Prix of the Americas Award at the Montreal World Film Festival for her body of work. She filmed two projects in Canada during this time: the independent film Between Strangers (2002), directed by her son Edoardo and co-starring Mira Sorvino, and the television miniseries Lives of the Saints (2004).In 2009, after five years off the set and 14 years since she starred in a prominent US theatrical film, Loren starred in Rob Marshall's film version of Nine, based on the Broadway musical that tells the story of a director whose midlife crisis causes him to struggle to complete his latest film; he is forced to balance the influences of numerous formative women in his life, including his deceased mother. Loren was Marshall's first and only choice for the role. The film also stars Daniel Day-Lewis, Penélope Cruz, Kate Hudson, Marion Cotillard, and Nicole Kidman. As a part of the cast, she received her first nomination for a Screen Actors Guild Award.

In 2010, Loren played her own mother in a two-part Italian television miniseries about her early life, directed by Vittorio Sindoni with Margareth Madè as Loren, entitled La Mia Casa È Piena di Specchi, based on the memoir by her sister Maria. In July 2013 Loren made her film comeback in an Italian short-film adaptation of Jean Cocteau's 1930 play The Human Voice (La Voce Umana), which charts the breakdown of a woman who is left by her lover – with her younger son, Edoardo Ponti, as director. Filming took under a month during July in various locations in Italy, including Rome and Naples. It was Loren's first theatrical film since Nine. She returned to feature-length film, as Holocaust survivor Madame Rosa, in Ponti's 2020 feature film The Life Ahead. In 2021 she received AARP Best Actress and AWFJ Grand Dame awards for her role.

Loren received a star on 16 November 2017, at Almeria Walk of Fame due to her work on Bianco, rosso e.... She received the Almería Tierra de Cine award.

Personal life 
Loren is a Roman Catholic. Her primary residence has been in Geneva, Switzerland, since late 2006. She owns homes in Naples and Rome.

Loren is an ardent fan of the football club S.S.C. Napoli. In May 2007, when the team was third in Serie B, she (then aged 72) told the Gazzetta dello Sport that she would do a striptease if the team won.

Loren posed for the 2007 Pirelli Calendar.

In February 2021 she was the guest on BBC Radio 4's Desert Island Discs and chose a pizza oven as her luxury item. Her musical choices included Cole Porter's "I've Got You Under My Skin" as sung by Ella Fitzgerald, and Debussy's "Clair de lune" as played by Tamás Vásáry. She revealed that fellow actor Richard Burton was furious with her for cheating at Scrabble.

Marriage and family 

Loren first met Ponti in 1950, when she was 15 and he was 37. Though Ponti had been long separated from his first wife, Giuliana, he was not legally divorced when Loren married him by proxy (two male lawyers stood in for them) in Mexico on 17 September 1957. The couple had their marriage annulled in 1962 to escape bigamy charges, but continued to live together. In 1965, they became French citizens after their application was approved by then French Prime Minister Georges Pompidou. Ponti then obtained a divorce from Giuliana in France, allowing him to marry Loren on 9 April 1966.

They had two children, Carlo Ponti Jr., born on 29 December 1968, and Edoardo Ponti, born on 6 January 1973. Loren's daughters-in-law are Sasha Alexander and Andrea Meszaros. Loren has four grandchildren. Loren remained married to Carlo Ponti until his death on 10 January 2007 from pulmonary complications.In 1962, Loren's sister Maria married the youngest son of Benito Mussolini, Romano, with whom she had two daughters, Alessandra, a former MP and MEP, and Elisabetta.

Affair with Cary Grant 
Loren and Cary Grant co-starred in Houseboat (1958). Grant's wife Betsy Drake wrote the original script, and Grant originally intended that she would star with him. After he began an affair with Loren while filming The Pride and the Passion (1957), Grant arranged for Loren to take Drake's place with a rewritten script for which Drake asked to not receive credit. The affair ended in bitterness before The Pride and the Passions filming ended, causing problems on the Houseboat set. Grant hoped to resume the relationship, but Loren decided to marry Carlo Ponti instead.

Lawsuits 
In September 1999, Loren filed a lawsuit against 79 adult websites for posting altered nude photos of her on the internet.

Filmography

Recognitions

Box office rating 
In The Motion Picture Herald, both British and American exhibitors voted for Loren within the Top Ten Money Making Stars Poll:
1960 – most popular actress (3rd most popular star in UK)
1961 – 2nd most popular actress (2nd most popular star in UK)
1962 – 3rd most popular actress (7th most popular star in UK)
1964 – most popular actress in UK, 24th most popular star in America
1965 – 4th most popular star in UK
1966 – 14th most popular star in America

Selected discography

Singles 
1955 – "Mambo Bacan" (from La Fille du Fleuve) / "Nyves" (RCA 18.350 10" 78rpm)
1956 – "Che m'e 'mparato a fà" / "I wanna a guy" (RCA, A25V-0473, 10" 78rpm)
1957 – "S'agapò" / "Adoro te" (with Paola Orlandi) (RCA, A25V 0585, 10" 78rpm)
1958 – "Bing! Bang! Bong!" (from Houseboat) / "Almost in Your Arms" (Philips PB 857 10" 78rpm)
1960 – "Goodness Gracious Me" / "Grandpa's Grave" (with Peter Sellers) (Parlophone, 45-R.4702 7" 45rpm)
1961 – "Zoo Be Zoo Be Zoo" / "Bangers and Mash" (with Peter Sellers) (Parlophone 45-R.4724 7" 45rpm)

Albums 
1958 – Houseboat (Philips – BBL 7292) – With George Duning and Cary Grant
1960 – Escandalos Imperiales (Heliodor – 610 800) – With Maurice Chevalier
1960 – Peter and Sophia (Parlophone – PCSM 3012, LP) – with Peter Sellers
1963 – Poesie di Salvatore Di Giacomo (CAM, LP)
1972 – Man of La Mancha (United Artists Records, LP) with Peter O'Toole, James Coco, Mitch Leigh, Joe Darion

Compilations 
1992 – Le canzoni di Sophia Loren (CGD, 2xCD)
2006 – Secrets of Rome (Traditional Line, CD)
2009 – Τι Είναι Αυτό Που Το Λένε Αγάπη – Το Παιδί Και Το Δελφίνι (:it:Δίφωνο, CD)

Russian National Orchestra 
Prokofiev – Peter and the Wolf, Jean-Pascal Beintus – Wolf Tracks. Mikhail Gorbachev, Bill Clinton, Sophia Loren. Russian National Orchestra – Kent Nagano. Pentatone PTC 5186011 (2003)
Prokofiev – Pedro y el lobo, Jean-Pascal Beintus – Las Huellas del Lobo. Antonio Banderas, Sophia Loren, Russian National Orchestra – Kent Nagano. Pentatone PTC 5186014 (2004).

Bibliography 
 Loren, Sophia (2015). Yesterday, Today, Tomorrow: My Life, Atria Books, .
 Loren, Sophia (1998). Sophia Loren's Recipes and Memories, Gt Pub Corp, .
Loren, Sophia (1984). "Women & Beauty", Aurum Press, . 
 Loren, Sophia (1972). In the Kitchen with Love, Doubleday, Library of Congress Catalog Card 79–183230.
 Loren, Sophia (1971), In Cucina con Amore, Rizzoli Editore.

References

External links 

Sophia Loren at the TCM Movie Database

 (video) Isabelle Putod, « Naissance d'une star : Sophia Loren », Reflets sur la Croistte, 15 mai 2011, sur ina.fr
 (video) Sophia Loren lors du tournage de Lady L en 1965, une archive de la :fr:Télévision suisse romande
 Sophia Loren Encinémathèque

1934 births
Living people
20th-century French actresses
20th-century Italian actresses
21st-century French actresses
21st-century Italian actresses
Academy Honorary Award recipients
Actresses from Naples
Actresses from Rome
Audiobook narrators
Best Actress Academy Award winners
Best Foreign Actress BAFTA Award winners
Cannes Film Festival Award for Best Actress winners
Cecil B. DeMille Award Golden Globe winners
César Honorary Award recipients
David di Donatello Career Award winners
David di Donatello winners
Honorary Golden Bear recipients
Golden Ariel Award winners
Grammy Award winners
Italian autobiographers
Italian emigrants to France
Italian expatriates in Switzerland
Italian women singers
Italian film actresses
Italian nobility
Italian people convicted of tax crimes
Italian Roman Catholics
Italian voice actresses
Nastro d'Argento winners
Naturalized citizens of France
Paramount Pictures contract players
People from Pozzuoli
People of Sicilian descent
RCA Victor artists
United Nations High Commissioner for Refugees Goodwill Ambassadors
Volpi Cup for Best Actress winners
Women cookbook writers